Éric Herman Andriantsitohaina (born 21 July 1991) is a Malagasy weightlifter. He represented Madagascar at the 2019 African Games held in Rabat, Morocco and he won the silver medal in the men's 61kg event. Four years earlier, he won the bronze medal in the men's 56 kg event at the 2015 African Games held in Brazzaville, Republic of the Congo.

In that same year, he also won the gold medal in the men's 55 kg event at the 2019 African Weightlifting Championships held in Cairo, Egypt. He won the bronze medal in his event at the 2021 African Weightlifting Championships held in Nairobi, Kenya.

In 2021, he competed in the men's 61 kg event at the 2020 Summer Olympics in Tokyo, Japan.

His brother Tojonirina Andriantsitohaina is also a competitive weightlifter.

References

External links
 

Living people
1991 births
Place of birth missing (living people)
Malagasy male weightlifters
African Games medalists in weightlifting
African Games silver medalists for Madagascar
African Games bronze medalists for Madagascar
Competitors at the 2015 African Games
Competitors at the 2019 African Games
Weightlifters at the 2020 Summer Olympics
Olympic weightlifters of Madagascar
African Weightlifting Championships medalists